Tsai Feng-an (born 20 November 1975) is a Taiwanese baseball player who competed in the 2004 Summer Olympics.

References

External links

1975 births
Living people
Asian Games medalists in baseball
Asian Games silver medalists for Chinese Taipei
Baseball first basemen
Baseball players at the 2002 Asian Games
Baseball players at the 2004 Summer Olympics
Medalists at the 2002 Asian Games
Olympic baseball players of Taiwan
People from Nantou County
Taiwanese baseball players
Mercuries Tigers players
Brother Elephants players
Sportspeople convicted of crimes
Match fixers
Taiwanese criminals